Sing Your Face Off is a reality singing series that was aired on ABC during the 2013–14 American television season. It was based on both the Endemol format Your Face Sounds Familiar and an adaptation of the Spanish "Tu cara me suena," the latter of whose title translated as "Your face is familiar to me." The first season consisted of six episodes, with two episodes airing back-to-back over three weeks. The first season premiered on May 31, 2014, and concluded on June 14, 2014. No plans were known to have been formed for a second season. Actress and singer China Anne McClain won the first and only season.

Premise
In the context of the program's celebrity-oriented premise, for such a celebrity to "sing one's face off" meant to sing live, but also to do so as part of an impersonation of a prominent recording artist. (The Legends In Concert productions were organized along a similar premise, featuring "tribute artists" who looked and sounded like those to whom they paid tribute.)

The premise of the show had the celebrities spin the "face finder wheel" at the end of the previous show to determine as which artist they would sing their faces off, with the exception of week 1 when the celebrities were given their artist. They then spent the week practicing the song along with any other necessary practicing such as playing an instrument, choreography, etc. that went along with the performance. They also spent that week getting any necessary make-up formats, outfits, accessories, or such that they needed to look like the artist as whom they would perform.

They then performed the songs, as the artist, and were given an individual score by each of the judges. This score was ranged on a scale from 1 to 10, and the maximum possible total was 30 points. At the end of all the performances, the celebrities were each given the chance to give an extra three points to any one of the other celebrities. The judges' scores and the extra points given by the celebrities were then added together to determine the winner for each night's episodes.

The celebrities' rankings on the scoreboard at the end of that week determined the order in which the celebrities then spun the "face finder wheel" to determine the artist as whom they would perform the following week.
At the end of four weeks, the celebrity with the lowest combined scores of all their four performances was eliminated from the competition.

From Week 4 on, at the end of the week, the celebrity with the lowest total score for that week was eliminated until the list of celebrities was narrowed down to a list of "Final 3" performers. The Final 3 performers then performed one more time; after that performance, the judges voted on who they believed should be crowned the winner of Sing Your Face Off; the celebrity then needed two votes out of the three from the judges to win.

Cast

Contestants

Judges
Debbie Gibson and Darrell Hammond acted as judges on every episode, while the third judge varied with each episode.

Guest judges

Performances

Overall scores
Red numbers indicate the singer whose score was lowest for that week.
Green numbers indicate the singer whose score was highest for that week.
 indicates an eliminated singer.
 indicates an eliminated singer who was eliminated by Judges Choice.
 indicates the winning singer.
 indicates the runner-up singer.
 indicates the third-place singer.

 Rather than give scores out of 30 for the contestants's performances, the judges each voted for who they thought deserved to win Sing Your Face Off. The celebrity then needed two out of three votes in order to win Sing Your Face Off.
 Since both Darrell Hammond and Debbie Gibson voted for China Anne McClain to win, China had the majority of the votes to win Sing Your Face Off, and Carmen Electra's vote was thus never revealed, leaving both Lisa Rinna and Landry Fields as runners-up.

Weekly scores and songs

Week 1
Running order

Week 2
Running order

Week 3
Running order

Week 4
Running order

Week 4 was a "Double Points" week, where the judges individually scored each singer out of a 20 instead of the previous 10 and the celebrities could give another celebrity 6 extra points rather than the previous 3.

Week 5
Running order

Week 6
Running order

Revival possibilities
In June 2014, Debbie Gibson, one of the judges, lent her support to efforts to renew Sing Your Face Off for a second season. However, ABC has not announced any plans for a second season.

References

2010s American reality television series
2014 American television series debuts
2014 American television series endings
American Broadcasting Company original programming
American television series based on Spanish television series
English-language television shows
Singing talent shows
Television series by Endemol
Your Face Sounds Familiar